William Earle Thomas  more commonly known as Earle Thomas is a soccer player who represented New Zealand at international level.

Thomas' clubs included Hamilton, University-Mount Wellington, Eastern Suburbs AFC, and Blockhouse Bay.

International career
Thomas made his senior All Whites debut in a 3–5 against Australia on 5 November 1967, and scored 2 goals in his first start 3 days later in a 3–1 win over Singapore. He went on to finish his international playing career with 23 A-international caps to his credit, his final cap coming in a 1–2 loss against New Caledonia on 2 October 1976.
Thomas scored 7 A-international goals and captained his country on numerous occasions.

Administration career
In 2013, Thomas became a founding committee member of the independent group Friends of Football

References

External links
 {When accessed on 23 March 2019, this link was inactive}

Year of birth missing (living people)
Living people
New Zealand association footballers
New Zealand international footballers
Association footballers not categorized by position
Place of birth missing (living people)